Camp Jackson is a United States Army camp south of Camp Red Cloud (in Uijeongbu) and 20 miles south of the city of Uijeongbu at the throat of the Uijeongbu Corridor, on the National Highway 3 now in the far northern Dobong-gu suburb of Seoul. It was one of the smallest US military installations in South Korea. The camp was named after Private First Class George W. Jackson who was awarded the Silver Star during the Korean War.

The US Eighth Army had an NCO Academy at Camp Jackson.

The KATUSA Training Academy operated a 19-day course which involves subjects essential to function with the American units, such as nuclear, biological and chemical training, how to put on and work in a protective mask, the M16 rifle, first aid, land navigation, military customs courtesies, and English classes. Instructors at KTA are volunteers from the ranks of the US Army, ROK Army, and KATUSA.

Personnel stationed at Camp Jackson were eligible for Hardship Pay.

Camp Jackson was handed back over to the South Korean government as part of the USFK transformation plan by 2016.

Photos

See also 
 List of United States Army installations in South Korea
 Korean Demilitarized Zone (DMZ)

References

External links
 www.facebook.com/usagrc, Camp Jackson & Area I Facebook page
redcloud.korea.army.mil, official website of USAG Area I, Camp Red Cloud, Camp Casey & Camp Jackson, Korea
 Cp Jackson article at ROKdrop,com 

Jackson (Korea), Camp
Jackson
Buildings and structures in Uijeongbu